Henry Krauskap House, also known as Henry Krauskap House and Store and Meiskey's, is a historic home located at Lancaster, Lancaster County, Pennsylvania. It was built in 1874, and is a -story, three bay brick combined commercial-residential building in the Italianate style. It has a two-story rear wing. A small brick one-story commercial addition was built between 1886 and 1888.  It is the oldest surviving structure for the manufacturing and marketing of cigar boxes and tobacco related products.

It was listed on the National Register of Historic Places in 1982.

References

Houses on the National Register of Historic Places in Pennsylvania
Italianate architecture in Pennsylvania
Houses completed in 1874
Houses in Lancaster, Pennsylvania
National Register of Historic Places in Lancaster, Pennsylvania